"Holomráz" is a single from the Holomráz album by the Czech pop music group Slza. The music was created by Lukáš Bundil and Dalibor Cidlinský Jr. and the text composed by Ondřej Ládek aka Xindl X.

Music video 
The music video is about an anniversary celebration, and Petr Lexa does not miss her on time, so he's trying to leave the conference. Actress Anna Kadeřávková played in it.

References 

Slza songs
Universal Music Group singles
2017 singles
2017 songs
Songs written by Xindl X